Civil Hospital, Larkana is a public hospital located in Larkana, Sindh.

History 
The cornerstone of this 100-bed hospital was laid by Khawaja Nizamuddin, Governor-General of Pakistan on February 1, 1951. The hospital was completed three years later, in 1954. Nawab Amir Ali Lahori provided land for the hospital. It was the first custom-built civil hospital in Larkana. Prior to the establishment of the hospital, the girls' school building on Baker Road was relocated in 1909 from Shikarpour (Sind) and was used as Larkana Civil Hospital.

Departments
Hospital departments include MRI & CT Scan, Outdoor & Indoor Pharmacy, Digital X-ray & Ultrasound Doppler Ultrasound, the Ophthalmology, and Pediatric Ophthalmology.

Other departments
 National Institute of Cardiovascular Diseases, Larkana
 Psychology
 Psychiatry
 Chest Asthma
 Ear Nose & Throat
 Emergency Department
 Orthopedics
 Tuberculosis
 AIDS
 Hepatitis
 Pathology
 Urology
 Nephrology
 Hematology
 General Physician
 Pulmonary Department

Service area
The territory of the Larkana Civil Hospital covers the Larkana district, Northern Sindh, and Balochistan. The hospital has a mobile service department.

Gallery

References

1951 establishments in Pakistan
Hospitals in Sindh